Minuscule 1582 (in the Gregory-Aland numbering). It is a Greek minuscule manuscript of the four Gospels. It is dated 948. According to the Claremont Profile Method it represents the Alexandrian text-type as a core member.

See also 
 List of New Testament minuscules
 Textual criticism
 Biblical manuscript

References 

Greek New Testament minuscules
10th-century biblical manuscripts